Justin Oliver Webb (born Justin Oliver Prouse, 3 January 1961 in Portsmouth, Hampshire) is a British journalist who has worked for the BBC since 1984. He is a former BBC North America Editor and the main co-presenter of BBC One's Breakfast News programme. Since August 2009, he has co-presented the Today programme on BBC Radio 4, and also regularly writes for the Radio Times.

Early life
In an article in the Radio Times in January 2011, Webb revealed that his natural father was Peter Woods who was formerly a reporter with the Daily Mirror and later became a BBC newsreader. Woods was married and Webb's mother, then Gloria Crocombe, was a secretary at the Daily Mirror and was divorced from her first husband at the time of the affair with Woods. Webb commented that his mother's split from Woods may have been as much her doing as his, saying "I do not believe she was abandoned". Woods provided financially for Webb but saw his son only once, when he was six months old. Webb took the surname of his stepfather when his mother remarried in 1964.

Webb grew up in Bath. He was privately educated at the independent Sidcot School, a Quaker school in Somerset, and the London School of Economics, where he wrote articles for student newspaper The Beaver.

Career
Webb joined the BBC as a graduate trainee in 1984 working in Northern Ireland for BBC Radio Ulster based in Belfast. He then worked as a reporter for BBC Radio 4's Today programme, before becoming a foreign affairs correspondent based in London and covering news around the world. He reported on the Gulf War and the war in Bosnia, the collapse of the Soviet Union and the first democratic elections in South Africa.

He then became a BBC News presenter based in London, and the main presenter on BBC One's Breakfast News programme from 1992 to 1997. He also presented the BBC's One and Six O'Clock News bulletins and presented BBC Radio 4's The World Tonight from 1997–1998. From 1998 he spent three years working as the BBC's Europe correspondent based in Brussels. During that time he reported on the workings of the European Commission and Parliament, the politics surrounding Britain's decision on whether to join the single currency and the enlargement on the European Union.

In 2001, Webb moved to the United States, as the BBC's chief Washington correspondent. Much of his time was spent on local Washington Radio, most notably, WAMU, a public radio station, on The Diane Rehm Show. He raised eyebrows within the BBC in 2006 when, at a seminar on impartiality, he said the corporation was anti-American and treated the US with "scorn and derision", according it "no moral weight". He has also presented a Radio 4 series on anti-Americanism. In December 2007, he became North American Editor for BBC News, a role newly created in time for the American presidential election of 2008. He replaced Matt Frei who moved to present the new World News America bulletin. Since November 2007, Webb has maintained a regularly updated blog on the BBC website.

In August 2009, Webb returned to the UK to replace Edward Stourton on BBC Radio 4's early morning news programme Today. In October 2017, Webb disclosed that his presenting colleague Nick Robinson was being paid £100,000 more than him, for doing "essentially the same job". Webb's pay amounted to £200,000, whilst Robinson's reached £300,000, despite his joining the programme six years before. Webb promoted that the era of the "big beast" news anchor would likely be drawing to a close, with the "very well-paid" John Humphrys and Huw Edwards "in the firing line".

Webb received criticism for appearing to endorse the view that: "antisemitism is a bit like the way some of our people might regard anti-white racism, that actually it's a different order of racism. It's not as important - it's still bad - but it's not as important as some other forms of racism..." on the BBC on March 12, 2019; a BBC spokesperson clarified that he was "not expressing any personal view" and that Webb "is the first to admit he should have phrased his question better."

In 2022, the BBC said Webb was not sufficiently accurate when he described the philosophy professor Kathleen Stock – who resigned following protests over her views on gender identity and transgender rights – as being "falsely" accused of transphobia. However, said that it was accurate to describe her as a subject of abuse by students.

Personal life
Webb married his long-term partner Sarah Gordon in the early 2000s. They have three children together: Martha, Sam and Clara. Whilst in the United States, their son Sam fell ill and was diagnosed with type 1 diabetes mellitus. As a result, Webb experienced the United States healthcare system first-hand. His son commonly joins his father in speaking about the disease. In 2012, Webb joined son Sam at Addenbrooke's Hospital in Cambridge, meeting Queen Camilla (then Duchess of Cornwall) as she visited the facilities. She later became a Royal Patron of the children's charity, JDRF, a charity which Webb supports on a regular basis.

In August 2009, Webb returned to Britain with his wife and children. They currently live in Camberwell, South London. In 2008, his mother, Gloria, died and he inherited her home in Bath, Somerset.

Bibliography

References

External links 
 
 BBC World biography
 Justin Webb's BBC blog

1961 births
Living people
Alumni of the London School of Economics
People from Bath, Somerset
BBC newsreaders and journalists
English expatriates in the United States
People educated at Sidcot School